Dimitrios Patsiogeorgos (born 6 January 1994) is a Greek professional footballer who plays as a goalkeeper for A.P.S. Zakynthos.

Career
He started his career from the youth teams of Pierikos, until 1 July 2011, when he signed a professional contract and moved to the first squad. He remained at the club for 3 seasons, making a total of 15 appearances. On 20 January 2015 he signed with AEL. He debuted with his new club on 26 April 2015, in Pampeloponnisiako Stadium in Patras during a Promotion Playoff match against Panachaiki. He was called from the bench to replace the team's first goalkeeper Manolis Apostolidis who was expelled with a red card.

References

External links
 a-sports
 
 myplayer

1994 births
Living people
Footballers from Katerini
Greek footballers
Association football goalkeepers
Athlitiki Enosi Larissa F.C. players